The 2006 Vadodara riots also known as the 2006 Dargah riots occurred on 1 May of that year in the city of Vadodara in the state of Gujarat in India. The riots were caused by the municipal council's decision to remove the dargah (shrine) of Syed Chishti Rashiduddin, a medieval Sufi saint. The shrine was between two and three hundred years old. The incident resulted in six to eight people being killed and forty-two injured, 16 of these were from police shooting.

Background

The dargah was first mentioned in a municipal survey carried out in 1912, when Vadodara was the princely state of Baroda and was ruled by Sayajirao Gaekwad III. The city Mayor, Sunil Solanki, had said that the council were removing illegal buildings as part of a road widening programme and that they had already removed 20 temples and three dargahs.

On 2 April, the Gujarat High Court looked into the incidents suo motu and decided that "encroachments on public roads cannot be tolerated", and that if needed, "anti-socials" who opposed these demolitions should be arrested before the demolition was carried out. The Supreme Court overturned the judgment on 4 April and ordered a temporary stay on demolition of illegal religious structures, due to the situation being volatile." 

The commissioner for police, Deepak Swaroop, had requested caution on the issue. But Solanki insisted on the programme continuing as the shrine was in the way of development. It is reported that he said "If the police and the corporation will not do it, our boys in the Bajrang Dal will do it."

Riots

On the first day it is estimated that eighteen people were injured and thirty-eight placed under arrest. The police have stated that they had at first used tear gas and batons in an attempt to control the crowd, but were left with no option other than to shoot. On the 2 May there were incidents of violence between Muslims and Hindus in several areas. On 3 May the State government requested that the federal government provide additional security personnel. A Muslim man had been burned to death in his car by a 1,500 strong crowd, and cases of arson had been reported. People were also evacuated out of the Ajabdi Mills area as a precaution. 

Frontline wrote of the incident unlike the riots of 2002, this was only a skirmish. There were spontaneous clashes between two communities. There were casualties on both sides, of innocent people just like in 2002 but at much milder scale. The violence of 2002 was a far more widespread and has been opined to be a state-sponsored, planned and systematic targeting of Muslims." The Independent People's Tribunal, an NGO has stated that the police had targeted Muslims during the incident. 

The home minister for Gujarat, Amit Shah, stated that as a result of the incident paramilitary forces had been deployed and security increased in five of Gujarat's districts

See also

1969 Gujarat riots
1985 Gujarat riots

References

Mass murder in 2006
History of Gujarat (1947–present)
Religiously motivated violence in India
Anti-Muslim violence in India
Attacks on religious buildings and structures in India
2006 riots
 
Riots and civil disorder in India
Crime in Gujarat
May 2006 events in India
2006 murders in India
Massacres in India